The 2009 British & Irish Lions tour to South Africa was an international rugby union tour which took place in South Africa from May to July 2009.

The British & Irish Lions played a three-match Test series against South Africa, with matches in Durban, Pretoria and Johannesburg, as well as matches against six provincial teams, and a match against the Emerging Springboks, South Africa's second national team. The Lions won all six provincial matches and drew with the Emerging Springboks, 13–13.

South Africa won the Test series, defeating the Lions 26–21 in the first Test, and then 28–25 in the second Test. The third Test was won by the Lions 28–9. The highlight of the series was the second Test, which the Lions led until the 76th minute, when they fell 25–22 behind. Stephen Jones then scored a penalty to tie the score at 25–25 with only two minutes left, but two minutes into injury time, Morné Steyn scored a 52-metre penalty kick to win the match for South Africa, 28–25.

The tour followed the 2005 British & Irish Lions tour to New Zealand and preceded the 2013 British & Irish Lions tour to Australia.

Background 
The tour was confirmed by the South African Rugby Union on 21 September 2007. The Lions chief executive John Feehan stated in November 2007 that no home Test match would be played prior to departure, as had taken place in 2005, and that fewer players and personnel would go to South Africa than had gone to New Zealand in 2005.

The Lions' tour manager was Gerald Davies, the head coach was Ian McGeechan, and the captain of the squad was Munster captain and Ireland lock, Paul O'Connell.

The tour schedule was announced by the Lions and the South African Rugby Union (SARU) on 10 April 2008. The final fixture confirmed was the game in Port Elizabeth; on 22 January 2009, SARU announced that they had received permission from the South African government to hold the match on the Youth Day national holiday on 16 June. This match marked the debut of the Southern Kings, a franchise formed in the Southern and Eastern Cape region, following the failure of the Southern Spears.

Head coach Ian McGeechan had planned to take the Lions squad to the Spanish city of Granada, at the foot of the Sierra Nevada mountains for a high-altitude training camp, but on 27 April he announced that it had been cancelled because of problems over player availability. The Lions flew to South Africa on 24 May, arriving the following day.

The format was similar to that of the Lions' 2005 tour of New Zealand. As in 2005, six games were played before the first Test, and a mid-week game between the first and second Tests; unlike 2005, there was no mid-week game between the second and third Tests. Due to its unpopularity, The Power of Four anthem was not used on the 2009 tour.

Schedule

Test series

First Test
South Africa won the first Test in Durban 26–21. Leading 19–7 at half-time and 26–7 after 50 minutes, the Springboks had dominated the scrum until the Lions made several substitutions. The Lions mounted a strong comeback, scoring late tries through Tom Croft and Mike Phillips, but South Africa held on. Inside the last ten minutes of the game, the Lions had two tries disallowed by the TMO. It was later described as an "unbelievable" Test match.

Second Test
The second Test at Loftus Versfeld in Pretoria was won by South Africa 28–25 with the last kick of the game – a penalty by Morné Steyn from inside his own half. The Lions had led 19–8 after an hour, but tries from Bryan Habana and Jaque Fourie allowed South Africa to tie the score before Steyn's series-winning kick. It was described as "devastation" for the Lions, with the team ending the game "looking more like a scene from [American television series] ER as opposed to a rugby team".

Controversy
The week of the third Test was marked by controversy and intense media interest surrounding the suspended Springbok players Schalk Burger and Bakkies Botha after a very physical second Test.

Burger was yellow-carded in the first minute, after he appeared to gouge Luke Fitzgerald's eye. Burger was subsequently banned for eight weeks for "making contact with the face in the eye area." He was cleared of gouging, as his action was found to be "reckless" but not intentional.

Burger was widely criticised, with many commentators believing he should have been sent off for the incident. Brian O'Driscoll was among many who criticised South Africa coach Peter de Villiers after he said Burger's actions should not even have led to a yellow card.

Bakkies Botha was banned for two weeks for a dangerous charge on prop Adam Jones, which left Jones with a dislocated shoulder. SA Rugby expressed their confusion over the reasons for Botha's ban with the coach calling it a "textbook cleanout". An appeal was lodged but the initial ruling was upheld. Coaches and players expressed concern about the impact such an interpretation might have on a core component of the game, with Lions player Phil Vickery and forwards coach Warren Gatland lending their support to Botha's case. The injured Jones himself later came out in defence of Botha saying:
"Botha shouldn't have been banned for it, nowhere near it. I don't have any complaints. He just cleared me out of the ruck and I got caught. Everyone counter-rucks nowadays and, if anything, I was in the wrong place. He just hit me and I was unlucky. So I was surprised to see he got banned. I know we didn't cite him so I don't know why the independent commissioner did. It was just a fair ruck from a hard player. When I have met him before he seems like a tidy enough bloke so I'm not seeing it as anything malicious."
The Springboks came out for the third Test wearing white armbands with the words "Justice 4" on, in protest over perceived inconsistencies in the citing process. This protest was investigated by the IRB for allegedly "bringing the game in disrepute", and the team and management were fined accordingly.

Third Test
The Lions won the third Test on 4 July at Ellis Park in Johannesburg, beating the Springboks 28–9, in what The Times called "one of the best and most heroic performances in the history of the Lions". Having already won the series, the Springbok squad saw 10 changes from the previous week, and the Lions also saw substantial changes. The Lions led from the start, and Shane Williams scored two tries. England lock Simon Shaw was sin-binned for striking Springboks scrum-half Fourie du Preez with his knee in this test and received a two-week ban as a result. This was the first Test victory for the Lions in eight years, their last being in Brisbane in 2001.

Jamie Roberts was voted the Lions' sponsors' 'Player of the Series' by British and Irish journalists.

Results
All times are local (UTC+2)

First Test

Second Test

Third Test

Lions squad 
The Lions announced a 37-man squad on 21 April 2009. Before the start of the tour Tomás O'Leary, Tom Shanklin and Jerry Flannery all withdrew because of injuries and Alan Quinlan was suspended. During the tour, Leigh Halfpenny, Stephen Ferris, Euan Murray, Lee Byrne, Adam Jones, Gethin Jenkins, Jamie Roberts and Brian O'Driscoll, as well as Ferris' replacement Ryan Jones, were forced to withdraw from the squad due to injury. Nathan Hines was suspended for one week because of a dangerous tackle against the Emerging Springboks.

Lions management 
23 backroom staff were appointed by the Lions, slightly down from the 26 on the 2005 tour to New Zealand. The Lions reverted to having only one management structure, rather than a separate team for the midweek side. The tour manager was former Wales and Lions player Gerald Davies.

Coaches

See also 

List of British & Irish Lions test matches

References

External links
2009 British & Irish Lions tour to South Africa at ESPN

British and Irish Lions
British & Irish Lions tours of South Africa
British And Irish Lions Tour To South Africa, 2009
Lions
Lions